Veronicastrum tubiflorum, is a plant species in the family Plantaginaceae, native to eastern Asia, found in meadows and thickets.  The pale blue or pink flowers appear from June to August, and the plant ranges in size from 40 to 70 cm.

External links  
 Efloras description

Plantaginaceae
Flora of Chita Oblast
Flora of Amur Oblast
Flora of Khabarovsk Krai
Flora of Primorsky Krai
Flora of Mongolia
Flora of Manchuria
Flora of Korea
Plants described in 1835